The Stuttgart Media University or Media University is a state university of media studies in Stuttgart, Germany.

It was formed in 2001 by the union of the two former schools: the Hochschule für Druck und Medien and the Hochschule für Bibliotheks-und Informationswesen.

The University offers bachelor's and master's degrees in three faculties: 
Faculty of Printing and Media
Faculty of Electronic Media
Faculty of Information and Communication
It also offers a doctorate in collaboration with partner universities. It has an Institute for Applied Research and operates the university publisher, Verlag Stuttgart.

Former schools 

 Hochschule für Druck und Medien was founded in 1903, based on an earlier technical school for printing founded in 1853 as the Fachschule für Buchdruckgewerbe Stuttgart. 
 The Hochschule für Bibliotheks-und Informationswesen was founded in 1942 as Büchereifachschule Stuttgart. 

Both schools are now defunct after their union to form Media University.

Alumni 
Among the notable alumni of the Stuttgart Media University or its predecessors are Arek Gielnik, the producer of Neukölln Unlimited, and Jörn Grosshans, who won a 2013 Hollywood Post Alliance Award for the outstanding visual effects in Game of Thrones (season 3).

References

External links
English Language website 
German language website

Universities and colleges in Baden-Württemberg
Information schools
Education in Stuttgart
Educational institutions established in 2001
2001 establishments in Germany